Dyosku (Coosku) is a rural locality (a selo), and one of two settlements in Abyysky Rural Okrug of Abyysky District in the Sakha Republic, Russia, in addition to Abyy, the administrative center of the Rural Okrug. Its population as of the 2010 Census was 53; down from 87 recorded in the 2002 Census.

References

Notes

Sources
Official website of the Sakha Republic. Registry of the Administrative-Territorial Divisions of the Sakha Republic. Abyysky District. 

Rural localities in Abyysky District